Book of Lies is the second studio album by Australian pop rock band End of Fashion. It was released on 27 September 2008 on EMI Music Australia. It was recorded in Perth, Western Australia, co-produced by Magoo (Midnight Oil, Powderfinger, Regurgitator) and Andy Lawson (Little Birdy), mixed by Tim Palmer (U2, The Cure, Robert Plant) in Los Angeles and mastered by Stephen Marcussen (R.E.M., Rolling Stones, Stevie Nicks, Tom Petty).

Background 

Bass player Tom King explained that Magoo provided the inspiration for the album's title: "It started off with Magoo keeping a journal in the studio, which we dubbed 'the book of lies'. "

In an interview with Xpress Magazine, lead singer Justin Burford explained:

The biggest point of difference between the first record and this one is the time we took preparing. The preparation time for the first album was like, a couple of years on the road. So we were basically like a garage pop band who went into a studio. Dennis didn't really give us the chance to develop or grow beyond that. It was like what we knew went onto the record. This time it was... like an exam. We studied way harder; just the preparation was far more intense. Once we had a pretty good idea of what everything was going to sound like, we didn't need much time in the studio, because we had spent six months working on the demos.

Singles 

The video for the band's first single, "Fussy", was directed by Natasha Pincus, who also directed the award-winning video for Paul Kelly's "God Told Me To". The video sees Burford as the demented killer and his bandmates as the cling-wrapped victims.

The single was released at the end of August 2008 and peaked at number 47 on the ARIA singles charts.

The second single, "Dying for You", was co-written by Burford with Julian Hamilton of The Presets.

Track listing 

All songs written by Justin Burford, except where noted.

 "Biscit" – 2:41
 "Kamikaze" – 4:01
 "Down or Down" – 3:20
 "American" – 3:05
 "Force of Habit" – 4:20
 "Dying for You" (Julian Hamilton, Burford) – 3:32
 "Fussy" – 4:17
 "Bullets" – 4:01
 "Trust" – 3:25
 "Exotica" – 3:48
 "Burning in Neon" – 2:54
 "Walk Away" – 5:35

Charts

References

External links 

 

2008 albums
End of Fashion albums